Dollingstown Football Club is an intermediate-level football club from Dollingstown, County Down, Northern Ireland. The club currently competes in the NIFL Premier Intermediate League. Dollingstown F.C's home ground is Planters Park in Dollingstown, which has a capacity of approximately 750 people. The manager of the club is Stephen Uprichard and the club was founded in 1979 by local football fans. 

With the club's founding, the club applied to join the Mid-Ulster Football League and were accepted into the 5th Division. Dollingstown F.C. won their first award, the John Magee Cup, in the 1992/93 season under the management of Colin McCullough. In the 2010/11 Season, the club was rejected a promotion to the IFA Championship 2 for allowing an ineligable player to play in eight league matches. The club withdrew many of the points they gained through these games, and appealed the decision. The club took it to court, but it was dismissed.

In 2019, the club marked their 40th anniversary, which was celebrated with a 3 course dinner at the Seagoe Hotel. Later in 2019, the club gained the sponsorship of Huhtamäki, a sustainable food packaging solutions company. As of February 2023, they remain Dollingstown F.C.'s main sponsor.

History

Early Years 
Dollingstown F.C. was founded in 1979 by a group of locals who met up every couple of days to play football. The club's first home ground was at the Railway Tavern in Moira. The club gained their first sponsor, EPH Car Sales, who sponsored their first kit. With the club's founding, the club applied to join the Mid-Ulster Football League and were accepted into the 5th Division. During the club's early years, Dollingstown played in Division 5 for four seasons. The club was then promoted to the 4th Division and then onto the 4th Division. During this period, the club's home grounds were in Monbrief, Craigavon. Dollingstown later relocated their home grounds onto the Gorden Playing Fields in Lurgan, slowly working their way back to their roots in the Dollingstown area. Dollingstown F.C. won their first award, the John Magee Cup, in the 1992/93 season under the management of Colin McCullough.

Further League Promotion 
As a result of Dollingstown F.C. growing and playing in the 3rd division, the club decided that they needed to bring in a vision and a fresh a approach in order to allow the club to push on and make it into Intermediate football, which was the club's aim. The club committee asked Hubert Watson to come onboard as Dollingstown F.C.'s Manager in the 1998/99 season. In the 1999/00 season, Watson's second full season, Dollingstown won Division 3 and gained promotion into Division 2. The club remained in the 2nd Division for a  few seasons before gaining promotion into Division 1.

Dollingstown F.C. v The Irish Football Association 
In the 2010/11 season, Dollingstown was rejected a promotion into the IFA Championship 2 for allowing an ineligible player, Ashley Gregg, to play in eight league matches. Consequently, they were withdrew of all the points they had obtained in the matches the player took part in, and finished in 4th place instead of 1st. In response, the decision was appealed by the club. The club ended up taking their case all the way to the High Court. However, it was dismissed. If Dollingstown F.C. had won their case, they would have been promoted, which would lead to Chimney Corner being relegated. In the end, the Tandragee Rovers were crowned champions of the division instead, but did not apply for their entry to the Championship. Hubert Watson, Chairman of Dollingstown F.C., expressed his opinion on the incident: “I feel absolutely disgusted with the administration of football in Northern Ireland. Dollingstown were transparent in everything we have done, and yet we are the ones being punished. The judge has decided, so it's the end of the road for us in this. We'll be in the Mid Ulster League this season."

In the 2012/13 season, they narrowly missed out on a place in Championship 2 again. After winning the league title, they faced Northern Amateur Football League champions Newington in a two-legged play-off for promotion, and lost the tie on the away goals rule after it finished 4–4 on aggregate. A 3–2 home win followed by a 2–1 away defeat was not enough, and Newington were promoted at Dollingstown F.C.'s expense.

Tournament Promotion 
In the 2013/14 season, the club secured promotion to the NIFL Championship after winning a play-off against Brantwood. After losing the first leg 2–1 at Skegoneill Avenue, Dollingstown won the second leg 5–2 at Planters Park to ensure a 6–4 victory on aggregate. As a result, they were promoted to NIFL Championship 2 in place of Killymoon Rangers, who had finished bottom of Championship 2. They became the first club relegated from Championship 2 since its inauguration in 2009. In 2016 the club was relegated from the Northern Ireland Football League but as of 2017-18 season was promoted back into the league after winning Intermediate A at a canter.

40th Anniversary 
In 2019, Dollingstown celebrated its 40th Anniversary of the club's founding. The club celebrated by holding a dinner celebration event at the Seagoe Hotel in Portadown on 1 June 2019. The event included food and entertainment. In the club's own words, put out on 10 April, 2018, "we would love for as many old managers, players, coaches, or other people who have been involved with the club at any stage to come and join us for a great night." The event, which began at 7pm, was compered by Pete Snodden, a radio presenter for Cool FM. The special guest of the celebration was Jim Magilton, a NI footballer who has notably played for Ipswich Town, Oxford United and Southampton. As of March 2023, he is the current manager of the Northern Ireland national Under-21's. The club also celebrated the anniversary by holding a "Current vs Oldies" football game, which took place on New Years 2019.

Managerial History

Team Managers 
Dollingstown F.C.'s first manager was Colin McCullough; Dollingstown won their first trophy, the John Magee Cup, under his management. From 1999-2006, Dollingstown became under the management of Hubert Watson. In 2006, Gary Duke took over as Manager of the Club. After 10 years, Duke resigned in 2016. He was then succeeded by Stephen Uprichard, the current manager of the club.

Reserve Team Managers 
Brian Gregson was the Reserve Team Manager in 2010. Timmy Lenon then took over the role of Reserve Team Manager until 2011. He was followed by Graeme Hynds (2011-2013), Simon Brown (2013-2015), Brian King (2015-2016), David Harvey & Colin Martin (2016-2017), Craig Willsher (2017), Daniel Bennett (2017-2018, Interim), Aron Ewins & Gary Morrow (2017-2018, Interim), Simon Brown (2018-2020), Alan Murdough (2020-2021) and Steven Park. As of March 2023, Steven Park has been the Reserve Team Manager for two years, since 2021.

First Team Squad

Club Honours (Trophies)
Irish Intermediate Cup: 1
2019/20
Bob Radcliffe Cup: 2
2016/17, 2021/22
Mid-Ulster Football League: 5
2008/09, 2012/13, 2013/14, 2016/17, 2017/18
Mid Ulster Football League Division Three: 5
1999/00, 2012/13, 2013/14, 2016/17, 2017/18
Marshall Cup: 5
2008/09, 2011/12, 2012/13, 2013/14, 2017/18
Premier Cup: 2
2009/10, 2013/14
John Magee Cup: 1
1992/93
Reserve Division Two: 1 
2008/09
Wilmor Johnston Memorial Cup: 2
2014/15, 2018/19
O'Hara Cup: 1
2013/14

Sponsors

Notable Sponsors 
Dollingstown F.C. currently has 54 sponsors. Notable sponsors include Huhtamäki, Christians Against Poverty, Lurgan Credit Union Ltd. and Clubworld Travel. The club's main sponsor is Huhtamäki; they are also the club's Corporate Club/Shirt Sponsorship.

Complete List of Sponsors 
Dollingstown F.C.'s complete list of sponsors (as of March 2023) are as follows:

Huhtamäki, Next Level Sports, Seagoe Hotel, Clive Richardson Limited, Linton Sports Ground Solutions, Trade Signs, PC Lawncare, AB&C Insurance, A&H Nicholson, Tughans, LS Construction, Apex Blinds Limited, Christians Against Poverty, Brickyard Development Ltd., Gas Works, Decor8, Donnelly Group, Brian Uprichard Fuels, Haffey Sports Grounds, Gilford Van Hire Ltd., Global Home Ireland, Heak Engineering, Grace & O'Neill, Howard Abraham,  Irwine Electrical, Boyce Presicion Engineering, Lagan Valley Steels Ltd., Little Electrical Engineering Products, Lurgan Credit Union Ltd., Taylor and Braithwaite, E.Blakely, Norman Emerson Group, First Trust, Allen Plant Hire, Parkgate Service Station, CDF Financial, Ingram Surfacing, A1 Autos Ltd., James McCrory Transport, Strickland Tracks, Metal Technology, Trackline, Smiley Monroe, RORO Machinery Shipping Specialists, Portadown Fireplaces, Red by Alfred Briggs, Trinity Park, Robert Wilson, Roadside Motors, Spec-Drum Engineering, Sam Elliott, Wish Wash, TBF Thompson and Clubworld Travel.

References

External links
 Dollingstown F.C.'s Official Website
 nifootball.co.uk - (For fixtures, results and tables of all Northern Ireland amateur football leagues)

Association football clubs established in 1979
Association football clubs in Northern Ireland
Association football clubs in County Armagh
1979 establishments in Northern Ireland
Lurgan